John Laird may refer to:

 John Laird (American politician) (born 1950), California State Senator
 John Laird (footballer) (1935–2016) Australian rules footballer
 John Laird (philosopher) (1887–1946), Scottish philosopher
 John Laird (shipbuilder) (1805–1874), British shipbuilder and key figure in development of Birkenhead
 John Laird, Baron Laird (1944–2018), British Member of the House of Lords and Ulster Unionist Politician
 John E. Laird (born 1954), computer scientist
 John Houston Laird (1874–1959), politician in Saskatchewan, Canada
 John Keith McBroom Laird (1907–1985), Canadian author, barrister, and solicitor
 Jack Laird (1923–1991), American television writer and actor
 John Laird (minister) (1811-1896) Moderator of the General Assembly to the Free Church of Scotland in 1889